Lugongbagi Ahing (English: Marriage Night) is a 2011 Indian Meitei language film directed by Bijgupta Laishram and produced by T. Baruni Devi, under the banner of Baruni Films. The film features Gokul Athokpam, Bala Hijam and Ashok Seleibam in the lead roles. The film was released at Classic Hotel, Imphal on 3 June 2011. It is a 2011 blockbuster film.

Cast
 Gokul Athokpam as Koireng
 Bala Hijam as Purnima
 Ashok Seleibam as Purnima's love interest
 Sonia Hijam as Koireng's sister
 Ghanashyam
 Wangkhem Lalitkumar
 Narendra Ningomba as Koireng's brother
 SP Ingocha Yanglem
 Longjam Ongbi Lalitabi as Koireng's mother
 Heisnam Geeta as Purnima's mother
 Philem Puneshori as Koireng's sister-in-law

Soundtrack
Gopi (KOG) composed the soundtrack for the movie. Ghanashyam and Bijgupta Laishram wrote the lyrics.

Accolades
The movie bagged two awards out of the five nominations at the 1st Sahitya Seva Samiti MANIFA held in 2012. Pushparani Huidrom and Gopi (KOG) won the awards.

References

2010s Meitei-language films
2011 films
2011 in Indian cinema